The name Betty has been used for a total of twenty tropical cyclones worldwide: one in the Atlantic Ocean, two in the South Pacific Ocean, one in the South-West Indian Ocean, and sixteen in the Western Pacific Ocean (most recently for two storms in the Philippines by PAGASA).

In the Atlantic:
 Hurricane Betty (1972), developed north-northeast of Bermuda, did not make landfall

In the South Pacific:
 Tropical Cyclone Betty (1966), made landfall in the Northern Territory of Australia
 Cyclone Betty (1975), looped near Fiji

In the South-West Indian:
 Tropical Storm Betty (1963)

Western Pacific:
 Tropical Storm Betty (1945)
 Typhoon Betty (1946), approached Japan
 Tropical Storm Betty (1949) (T4923)
 Typhoon Betty (1953) (T5319), struck the Philippines
 Tropical Storm Betty (1958) (T5812)
 Typhoon Betty (1961) (T6104, 11W), Category 4 super typhoon, struck Taiwan
 Typhoon Betty (1964) (T6405, 07W, Edeng), formed east of Taiwan, passed near Shanghai
 Tropical Storm Betty (1966) (T6617, 17W)
 Typhoon Betty (1969) (T6908, 08W, Huling), struck China
 Typhoon Betty (1972) (T7214, 14W, Maring), Category 4 super typhoon, struck China
 Typhoon Betty (1975) (T7512, 14W, Ising), struck Taiwan and China
 Typhoon Betty (1980) (T8021, 25W, Aring), struck the Philippines
 Tropical Storm Betty (1984) (T8404, 04W, Konsing), struck China
 Typhoon Betty (1987) (T8709, 09W, Herming), Category 5 super typhoon, struck the Philippines and China
 Tropical Storm Bavi (2015) (T1503, 03W, Betty), affected Kiribati, Marshall Islands, Mariana Islands, and  Philippines
 Typhoon Wutip (2019) (T1902, 02W, Betty), Category 5 super typhoon, caused over $3.3 million (2019 USD) in damages in Guam and Micronesia

Atlantic hurricane set index articles
Pacific typhoon set index articles
South-West Indian Ocean cyclone set index articles
Australian region cyclone set index articles